Simon Magalashvili (born January 4, 1968) is an Israeli Olympic judoka.

Judo career
In 1991, he came in 7th in the 1991 World Judo Championships in the U95kg category in Barcelona.

Competing in judo for Israel at the 1992 Olympics in Barcelona, Spain, in the Men's Half-Heavyweight category, he came in tied for 21st out of 34 competitors.

References

External links
 
 
 

1968 births
Living people
Israeli male judoka
Olympic judoka of Israel
Judoka at the 1992 Summer Olympics
20th-century Israeli people